Hyndsdale is an unincorporated community in Jefferson Township, Morgan County, in the U.S. state of Indiana.

History
Hyndsdale had its start by the building of the railroad through that territory. The community was named after a local family of settlers.

A post office was established at Hyndsdale in 1869, and remained in operation until it was discontinued in 1904.

Geography

References

Unincorporated communities in Morgan County, Indiana
Unincorporated communities in Indiana
Indianapolis metropolitan area